Imran Asif (born 6 July 1990) is an Austrian cricketer. He played for Austria in the 2011 ICC European T20 Championship Division One tournament. In May 2021, he was named in Austria's squad for the 2021 Central Europe Cup. He made his Twenty20 International (T20I) debut on 23 May 2021, for Austria against the Czech Republic.

References

1990 births
Living people
Austrian cricketers
Austria Twenty20 International cricketers
Cricketers from Sargodha